Gilmerson dos Santos Mota (born 27 February 1992), commonly known as Gil Bahia, is a Brazilian footballer who currently plays as a defender for Club Africain.

References

External links
 Gil Bahia at playmakerstats.com (English version of calciozz.it)
 
 “S-au respectat ca fotbalisti” (vrn.ro) 
 Trei jucători de la Vaslui pot ajunge la CS U Craiova! Gil Bahia este ultima "țintă" (digisport.ro) 
 

Living people
1992 births
Brazilian footballers
Brazil youth international footballers
FC Vaslui players
US Ben Guerdane players
Liga I players
Association football defenders
Sportspeople from Salvador, Bahia